UMF may stand for:

Music
 Ultra Music Festival, an annual music festival that takes place in Miami
 "UMF", the eighth track on Duran Duran (1993 album)

Organizations
 United Minorities Front, Assam, a political party in Assam
 University of Maine at Farmington
 University of Michigan–Flint
 The acronym of Universitatea de Medicină și Farmacie (University of Medicine and Pharmacy), the name of several universities in Romania:
 University of Medicine and Pharmacy of Bucharest
 University of Medicine and Pharmacy of Cluj-Napoca
 University of Medicine and Pharmacy of Craiova
 University of Medicine and Pharmacy of Iaşi
 University of Medicine and Pharmacy of Târgu Mureş
 University of Medicine and Pharmacy of Timişoara

Other
 Underground mine fire
 Universal Message Format, an XML dialect for message passing
 Unique Mānuka Factor, a grading system for Mānuka honey